Kvetkai is a village in Biržai district municipality, northern Lithuania. It is located about 3 km away from the border with Latvia. Nemunėlis flows through the village.

It has a wooden St. John the Baptist Church (1772) and a primary school established in 1835.

Famous people 
Petras Kalpokas

References
Parapijos puslapis
Kvetkų pagrindinės mokyklos puslapis
  
 

Villages in Panevėžys County
Novoalexandrovsky Uyezd